The As-Salafi Mosque, also known as "The Salafi Mosque" or "Wright Street", is a Salafi mosque founded in 2002 and located in the Small Heath area of Birmingham, metres from the intersection of Muntz and Wright Streets and just behind Coventry Road. The mosque is contained within the same building and connected to the registered charity and Islamic materials publisher Salafi Publications and the "SalafiBookstore" (an extensive online multimedia platform in relation to this exists, such as SalafiSounds.com and Sunnah.TV).

According to the mosque director, Abu Khadeejah Abdul-Wahid, more than a thousand men, women, and children pray the Friday 'jum'ah' Prayers there, and the mosque also contains a primary school and an evening Qur'an memorization school. According to mosque flyers, there are usually Islamic-based lessons every day of the week as well as seasonal conferences which can attract around 3000 attendees from the UK and around Europe.

During a 2002 season conference, the international media spotlight was set upon Masjid As-Salafi when a Swedish ex-criminal Kerim Chatty, who was due to attend the conference, was arrested in Sweden for carrying a firearm, presumably forgotten in his luggage and later charged with a firearms offence (not attempted hijacking). Abu Khadeejah Abdul-Wahid issued a public statement, stating that the individual was unknown to the organizers of the conference, and he then relayed the positions of Salafism in regard to terrorism based on the rulings (fatwa) of Islamic scholars like Saudi Arabia's Grand Mufti Abdul-Aziz ibn Abdullah Al Shaykh, Muhammad Nasiruddin al-Albani, Abd al-Aziz ibn Baz, Muhammad ibn al Uthaymeen, and Muqbil bin Hadi al-Wadi'i.

Dawud Burbank (Abu Talhah) was a former senior lecturer at Masjid Salafi.

Masjid Salafi is one of one-hundred and sixty-three mosques in the city of Birmingham, England. It is also one of six mosques in the area of Small Heath Park.

See also
 Islam in England
 List of mosques in the United Kingdom
 Jamiat Ihyaa Minhaaj al-Sunnah

References

External links
 
 Salafi Publications

2002 establishments in England
Mosques in Birmingham, West Midlands
Mosques completed in 2002
Small Heath, Birmingham
Salafi mosques in the United Kingdom